The Hanged Man is a British crime drama series that aired on ITV in 1975. It was created and written by Edmund Ward.

Cast
Colin Blakely – Lew Burnett
Michael Williams – Alan Crowe
Gary Watson – John Quentin
David Daker – Piet Hollander
John Rees – Brian Nelson
Angela Browne – Elizabeth Hayden
Brian Croucher – Sammy Grey
William Lucas – George Pilgrim
Frank Wylie – David Larson
Julian Glover – Joe Denver
Jenny Hanley – Druscilla
Peter Halliday – Jean-Claud de Salle
John Bay – Sam Lambert
William Russell – Peter Kroger
Michael Coles – Hans Ericksen
Gareth Hunt – Eddie Malone
Jack Watson – Douglas McKinnon
Bill Mitchell – Harry Friedman
Alan MacNaughtan – Charles Galbraith
Naomi Chance - Jane Cowley
Tenniel Evans - Joseph
Victor Brooks - Nightwatchman
Fred Feast - Josef

Plot
Lew Burnett is a self-made man who owns a huge construction company.  However, his success has bred resentment and after his wife is killed in a plane crash a third attempt is made on Lew's life.  He then decides to pretend to be dead to avoid any more attempts on his life and find out who is trying to kill him and why.  He is helped by Alan Crowe, an old friend.  Burnett travels around the world to trace the nine potential suspects. In each episode, Burnett is caught up in a fight of some sort.

Episodes
"Wheel of Fortune" (15 February 1975)
"Tower of Destruction" (22 February 1975)
"Knave of Coins" (7 March 1975)
"Chariot of Earth" (14 March 1975)
"The Bridge Maker" (14 March 1975)
"Grail and Platter" (21 March 1975)
"Laws of Fortune" (28 March 1975)
"Ring of Return" (5 April 1975)

Turtle
The series also introduces a shady thief called Turtle played by John F. Landry. This character would later have his own series called Turtle's Progress.

Music
Music for the show was written by Alan Tew. The same score would turn up on such programs like The Two Ronnies, The People's Court, SpongeBob SquarePants and the 2009 film Black Dynamite.

References
Jim Sangster and Paul Condon, "TV Heaven", HarperCollins, 2005

External links 
 

1975 British television series debuts
1975 British television series endings
1970s British drama television series
British crime television series